Sarmīte Stone (born 30 May 1963) is a retired Latvian rower who won four medals in the eights at the world championships of 1982–1991, competing for the Soviet Union. She finished fifth in the coxless pairs at the 1988 Olympics and fourth in the eights at the 1992 Games.

References

External links

1963 births
Living people
Olympic rowers of the Soviet Union
Olympic rowers of the Unified Team
Rowers at the 1988 Summer Olympics
Rowers at the 1992 Summer Olympics
Latvian female rowers
World Rowing Championships medalists for the Soviet Union